Federico Villegas (born 13 July 1994) is an Argentine male BMX rider, representing his nation at international competitions. He competed in the time trial event at the 2015 UCI BMX World Championships.

References

External links
 
 

1994 births
Living people
BMX riders
Argentine male cyclists
Pan American Games medalists in cycling
Pan American Games bronze medalists for Argentina
Cyclists at the 2019 Pan American Games
Medalists at the 2019 Pan American Games
South American Games medalists in cycling
South American Games silver medalists for Argentina
Competitors at the 2014 South American Games
Place of birth missing (living people)
21st-century Argentine people